Jazin (also Romanized as Jazīn; also known as Gozī) is a village in Abadeh Tashk Rural District, Abadeh Tashk District, Neyriz County, Fars Province, Iran. As of the 2006 census, its population was 639, across 175 families.

References 

Populated places in Abadeh Tashk County